Carolyn J. B. Howard is an American politician who previously served the Maryland House of Delegates representing District 24 in Prince George's County. She was the Deputy Speaker Pro Tem of the Maryland House and a former chairman of the Legislative Black Caucus of Maryland.

Background
Born in DeLand, Florida.

 Florida A & M University, B.S. (Home Economics & Education)
 Bowie State College, M.Ed. (Educational Administration and Supervision)
 Sojourner-Douglass College, Honorary Doctorate (Humanities)

Director Department of Federal Programs, Prince George's County Public Schools, 2000-

In the legislature
 Member of House of Delegates, 1988–90, and since March 7, 1991.
 Deputy Speaker Pro Tem, 2007-.
 Member, Ways and Means Committee, 1993- (education subcommittee, 1994; vice-chair's subcommittee, 1995-; chair, housing & social issues subcommittee, 1995–96; chair, transportation subcommittee, 1997-)
 Joint Audit Committee (formerly Joint Budget and Audit Committee), 1993-
 Legislative Policy Committee, 2007-
 Joint Committee on the Management of Public Funds, 2007-
 Rules and Executive Nominations Committee, 2007-
 Member, Constitutional and Administrative Law Committee, 1991–92
 Joint Legislative Work Group on Community College Financing, 1994–95
 House Co-Chair, Joint Task Force on Payment Schedule of Property Taxes, 1995
 Deputy Majority Whip, 1995–99
 Member, Special Joint Committee on Competitive Taxation and Economic Development, 1996–97
 Special Committee on School Enrollment Management, 1996–97
 Special Committee on Rail Mergers, 1997
 Speaker's Advisory Committee on Legislative Redistricting, 2001–02
 Joint Committee on the Selection of the State Treasurer, 2002, 2003, 2007
 Chair, Prince George's County Delegation, 2003-06 (member, county affairs committee)
 Member, Legislative Black Caucus of Maryland (formerly Maryland Legislative Black Caucus), 1988- (chair, 1998-2000; member, redistricting committee, 2000-)
 Women Legislators of Maryland, 1991- (2nd vice-chair, 1996–97; treasurer, 2000–01; 2nd vice-president, 2001–02; 1st vice-president, 2003–04; executive board, at large, 2008–09)
 Chair, House Democratic Caucus, 1999-
 Member, Maryland Veterans Caucus, 2005-
 Member, National Conference of State Legislatures (education committee, 2005-)
 Southern Legislative Conference (economic development, transportation & cultural affairs committee, 2005-)
 Director, District 3, National Black Caucus of State Legislators (special assistant to President).

Served as a Delegate to the Democratic Party National Convention in 1984, 1992, 2000, 2004, and 2008.

Legislation (Sponsored and Co-sponsored, 2007-2012)
Legislative Session Accomplishments

Additional
Member, Professional Standards and Teacher Education Advisory Board, State Board of Education, 1986–87
 Local Health Services Funding Review Committee, 1993
 Maryland Comprehensive Transit Plan Transit Advisory Panel, 1998–99
 Commission on Education Finance, Equity, and Excellence, 1999-2002
 Transit Policy Panel, 2000
 Virginia-Maryland-District of Columbia Joint Legislative Commission on Interstate Transportation, 2000–03
 Task Force to Study Rent Stabilization for the Elderly in Prince George's County, 2007
 Blue Ribbon Commission on Maryland Transportation Funding, 2010–12
 Co-Chair, Communications Tax Reform Commission, 2012–13
 Member, Region Forward Coalition, Metropolitan Washington Council of Governments, 2012-

Website

References

Democratic Party members of the Maryland House of Delegates
African-American state legislators in Maryland
African-American women in politics
People from DeLand, Florida
Living people
Women state legislators in Maryland
1938 births
People from Prince George's County, Maryland
Florida A&M University alumni
Bowie State University alumni
21st-century American politicians
21st-century American women politicians
21st-century African-American women
21st-century African-American politicians
20th-century African-American people
20th-century African-American women